Pinagtongulan National High School is a high school in Lipa, Philippines.

History
In 1967, the government passed the Republic Act, which called for the creation of barangay high schools, which funded the Pinagtongulan school. The first one-room, Marcos-type building housed the first fifty (50) students, who were recruited from the private schools they were already enrolled in.

Schools in Lipa, Batangas
High schools in Batangas